Gigi Caruso (born 2000) is an American businessperson and hearing loss advocate. She cofounded a swimwear company, Gigi C, in 2017 and advocated for the passage of the Let California Kids Hear Act in 2019.

Life 
Caruso was born in 2000 to former swimsuit model and fashion designer Tina Caruso and businessman Rick Caruso. She was diagnosed with bilateral hearing loss at birth and fitted with hearing aids at the age of three months. Caruso attended speech therapy two to three times a week through middle school. When she was fourteen, her ability to hear and communicate improved when she was fitted with a Phonak Lyric hearing aid. She is an advocate for children with hearing loss. Alongside her parents, she advocated for the Let California Kids Hear Act (Assembly Bill 598) which was introduced to the assembly in 2019.

In 2017, Caruso cofounded the swimwear and activewear company, Gigi C, with her mother. The company is a direct-to-consumer brand. By 2019, she an influencer on Instagram and a fashion businessperson.

Caruso attended the University of Southern California. graduating in 2021. She was a member of Kappa Kappa Gamma.

References 

Living people
2000 births
Place of birth missing (living people)
21st-century American businesswomen
21st-century American businesspeople
Businesspeople from Los Angeles
American people of Italian descent
Brand founders
American women company founders
American disability rights activists
Activists from Los Angeles
University of Southern California alumni
Caruso family
Children's rights activists